Spalding Athletic Library sold sports and exercise books through American Sports Publishing Company from 1892 to 1941.  Both companies were owned and founded by Spalding. Books cover over 30 different sports and exercises, and over 20 different organizations.

History

Growth of Spalding Athletic Library
A. G. Spalding created the Spalding (company) in 1876.  Spalding has sold sports equipment from late 1876 to present.  Spalding Athletic Library sold sports and exercise books through the American Sports Publishing Company from 1892 to 1941.  Both companies were owned and founded by Spalding.  Spalding created the Spalding Athletic Library in 1892.  and founded the American Sports Publishing Company,   incorporated in New Jersey in 1892.  American Sports Publishing Company used a New York address from 1892 to 1941.  

James Edward Sullivan was President of the American Sports Publishing Company from 1892 to 1914  which published the Spalding Athletic Library.   John Doyle (vice president) was another key executive for the publishing company from 1892 to 1941.

Spalding Co purchased Wright & Ditson Co in 1892 and AJ Reach Co. in 1889.  For several years after the purchases, Wright & Ditson Co and AJ Reach Co continued to publish sports books separately from the Spalding Athletic Library name.    Professional baseball player George Wright  co-founded Wright & Ditson Co; and professional baseball player Al Reach founded AJ Reach Co.  The Spalding Baseball Guides were published under AG Spalding & Bros until 1893-1894, and starting in 1894-1895 by American Sports Publishing Company (but not using the Spalding Athletic Library name). 

1941, the American Sports Publishing Company (and Spalding Athletic Library) was sold to A.S. Barnes & Co. The books now sold under A.S. Barnes & Co. name.   In 1941 A.S. Barnes & Co. took over publishing the NCAA sports rules and record books from Spalding.

Mail order catalogue
Spalding produced mail order catalogues that provided a description, price and picture of their sports equipment, sports books, and exercise books. A couple of examples are How to Play Golf for 25 cents, How to Play Basketball at 10 cents, and How to Train for Bicycling at 10 cents.

Organizations
Sports and exercise books (guide books and rule books) were produced by Spalding Athletic Library for numerous organizations.

Some of the organizations included: Amateur Athletic Union (AAU), Association Football, Athletic League of the Young Men's Christian Associations of North American (YMCA), Inter-Collegiate Association of Amateur Gymnasts of America, Inter-Collegiate Athletic Association of the United States (IC4A), National Association of Professional Base Ball Leagues,  National Collegiate Athletic Association (NCAA), National Indoor Baseball Association of the United States, National Roque Association of America, Olympic Games, Public Schools Athletic League,  Pacific Association of the Amateur Athletic Union of the United States, Pacific Northwest Association of the Amateur Athletic Union of the United States, Public School Athletic Association of Jersey City, Public School Athletic Association of Newark,  Texas Inter-Collegiate Athletic Association, United States Inter-Collegiate Lacrosse Association, and Young Men's Christian Associations of North American (YMCA).        

May 1896 the  Official Rowing Guide was issued. Frederick R Fortmeyer (secretary of the National Association of Amateur Oarsmen) compiled the 86 page guide. It also includes laws governing the association.

By 1898 the following leagues (associations) had already formed:  The Amateur Hockey League of New York, The Amateur Hockey Association of Canada, and The Ontario Hockey Association. The 1898 Spalding Athletic Library book includes rules (laws) and results for each league (association).

July 1908, Spalding issued the official athletic rules of the Amateur Athletic Union of the United States.

In 1918 Spalding issued a book, Army and Navy Camp YMCA Physical Work to support athletic activities.  In 1919  Official Athletic Almanac of the American Expeditionary Forces 1919 A.E.F. Championships Inter-Allied Games  was issued.

Media coverage
Reviews are regarding the Spalding Athletic Library include:.

1914 Cincinnati Enquirer newspaper stated, ". . . the largest sports publishing concern in the United States".

An article by the Society for American Baseball Research (SABR) states, "It lasted for many years and enjoyed the greatest success of any publication of its kind."

The Brooklyn Daily Eagle (Brooklyn Eagle) newspaper stated regarding this collection, “devoted to all athletics pastimes, indoor and outdoor, and is the recognized American cyclopedia of sport”.

1902 Standard Union remarked on Spalding Athletic Library, "The almanac is now recognized throughout the United States as the official authority on all matters pertaining to records".

1902 Spalding book on Boxing, Brooklyn Citizen states, "... a vast amount of valuable and interesting information. Mr Elmer is the actor-pugilist, formerly sparing partner for James J. Corbett ..."

In 1904 book publisher D. Appleton & Co. issued several sports books with editor Ralph Henry Barbour using information from prior Spalding Athletic Library books by special arrangement from American Sports Publishing.

The 1916 Handbook of Athletic Games (MacMillan Company) stated on the Library, "For many handbooks on the different Track and Field events and coaching advice from experts; also for laying out of athletic fields and conduct of meets.

The Hamilton Review stated on the Athletic Almanac, "This book can be used as an absolute reliable authority on athletic records".

The New York Times, August 4, 1906 stated, "In publishing his review of the Olympic games of 1906 at Athens, James E Sullivan, the American representative appointed by President Roosevelt as the Commissioner of this Nation to the revival of the grand Hellenic festival, has produced a work that stands unrivaled in interest and of the utmost value as a book of reference and record".

Jennifer Harbster's Feb 12, 2014 review noted “If you have been involved in a sport, I am sure you recognize the Spalding name as the sporting-goods manufacturer and retailer. In the late 19th century Spalding also created a publishing house- the American Sports Publishing Company- which was responsible for publishing the infamous Spalding Guide series of sport/game/recreational guides, rules and almanacs”.

First 37 books
The following are books published between 1892 and April 1896.  Numbers 2, 3, and 4 were "issued monthly" under the Volume and Number.  "Issue monthly" was later dropped from the cover. The first eighteen books were issued in between 1892 to 1894.  Books nineteen to thirty six were issued between 1894 to May 1895.

Numerous books were published until 1941.

Sports and exercise

Spalding Athletic Library covered a variety of sports and exercises.  Advertisement inside Spalding includes lists of available books which include Archery, Athletics (Track and Field; All Around; Cross country running and Marathon), Badminton, Baseball, Basketball, Bicycling, Bowling, Boxing, Canoeing, Cricket, Croquet, Curling, Fencing, (American) Football, Golf, Gymnast, Handball, Hockey, Jujutsu, Lacrosse, Lawn Sports, Polo, Pushball, Quoits, Racquetball, Rowing (sport), Rugby, Skating, Soccer (Football), Squash (sport), Swimming, Tennis, Tumbling (gymnastics), Volleyball, and Wrestling. Bodybuilding books included Dumb Bell, Indian club, Medicine Ball, and Pulley Weights. 

In the self defense series, Jiu Jitsui with poses by A Minami and K Koyama.

Sports

Baseball

Spalding (Official) Baseball Guide was available 1870s to 1941. The Baseball Guide was published by A. G. Spalding & Bros. 1870s to 1893, and Spalding Athletic Library from 1894 until 1941. 

Henry Chadwick, through the Spalding Athletic Library collection, added the "Technical Terms of Base Ball" in 1897. 

Johnny Evers baseball hall of fame athlete added “How to Play Second Base” to the collection of the Spalding Athletic Library.  Published by American Sports Publishing Company in New York, and the price on the cover was 10 cents.  Copyright 1917. Topics include “Thinking Out Plays in Advance”, “Advise Against Blocking”, and “Important Foot-Work.”  The book also includes pictures and diagrams to assist with learning baseball. 

In 1917 Billy Evans "noted American League Umpire" teamed up with the Spalding Athletic Library for the book, "How to umpire".

In 1922 a Spalding baseball uniform (cap, shirt, belt, pants, stockings, mitt and ball) and a Spalding book “How to Pitch” was available for $6.75 from Spalding in Newark.  In 1906 the book alone sold for ten cents 

Ty Cobb wrote "Strategy in the Outfield."

1919 American Sports Publishing printed a thirty-two page magazine on baseball that included the "choosin' up" illustration by Leslie Thrasher.

Basketball
Spalding worked with Dr. James Naismith to develop the official basketball and rule book in the 1893-1894.  Spalding published guides on Basketball from the 1893-1894 to 1940-1941.  The guides were also used by the National Collegiate Athletic Association (NCAA)  and the Amateur Athletic Union (AAU)

Boxing
1902 William Elmer and Spalding issued "Boxing". The New York Times, stated that the work provided a comprehensive look at pugilist, and prize ring history. 

1913 and 1917 Spalding issued, “Boxing: a guide to the Manly Art of Self Defense. “ Includes the Science of Boxing, sparing partners, rules, hints, and many illustrations. 

1914 “How to Punch a Bag” by Young Corbett was issued. Includes sample workouts, instructions, and illustrations.

1932 “A.A.U. Boxing: Official Rules, Amateur Athletic Union of the United States: Olympic Rules (international Amateur Boxing Federation Rules)” was issued.

American football

Spalding published guides on American football from the 1893 to 1940.    Hall of Fame coach Walter Camp was used to write many of these guides.   These guides were for pro football and the National Collegiate Athletic Association.   In 1896 Walter Camp's the Official Football Guide was adopted by universities such as Cornell, Harvard, Penn, Princeton, and Yale as the official rule book.   The 1911 Walter Camp's Official Football Guide includes an All-American Football Team list, football highlights, scores, and records for major universities; and rules with diagrams. Smithsonian.  Retrieved Dec 16, 2020

Soccer (football)
Thomas Cahill (soccer) and others assisted on creating Spalding Official Soccer (Football) Guides.  The 1912 Spalding Official Soccer (Football) Guide include information on the 1912 Olympics, associations (AAFA, FIFA, American Amateur Foot Ball Association, and others), clubs, scores, records, standings, articles, and photographs. The New York Footballer's Protective Association was founded August 1912 for assisting injured athletes.    In 1911 Canadian George Orton teamed up with Thomas Cahill (soccer) for the Spalding Athletic Library Official Association Soccer (Foot Ball) Guide.   In 1920 J A McWeeney (from London) was editor for How to Play Soccer.    The Spalding Soccer (Football) guides were available from 1904-1905 to 1923-1924.

Croquet

Spalding issued several rules and laws books on Croquet in between 1911 to 1931,  editor Charles Jacobus for the 1910 issue.

Golf
May 1895 Spalding issued Official Golf Guide, revised by L B Stoddard, which included rules, regulations, history and illustrations.  Golf champions Harry Vardon and James Braid (golfer) collaborated on several editions of "How to Play Golf".   Tom Bendelow was editor on many Spalding Athletic Library's official golf guides in the early years. The guides included information on championships, illustrations, and "how to".   June 1901, Spalding issued the official golf guide by Charles S Cox which includes article and pictures of Harry Vardon.   Grantland Rice and Bobby Jones (golfer) teamed up for Spalding's Golf Guide 1932.

Ice hockey
Spalding created guides for ice hockey starting 1897-1898 to 1941.  The 1897-1898 guide was edited by JA Tuthill of the Montclair Athletic Club (ice hockey).  These guides were also for the National Collegiate Athletic Association. 

Arthur Farrell worked with Spalding on creating Ice Hockey Books 1901, 1905, 1906, and 1910. Frederick Toombs' Ice Hockey books were issued 1907, 1909, 1911-1914, and 1915-1918.

Rowing
May 1894 Spalding issued “Rowing” by E J Giannini. It provided a complete manual, with illustrations and valuable advice. The first section was titled, How to Use and Oar and Sculls.  A similar book was issued in 1901.  

In 1910 Spalding advertised book, Group XIII, No 128 “How to Row” by E J Giannini (gold medal winning Olympian in freestyle swimming).

Tennis
Champion Bill Tilden was editor for "The Kid: A Tennis Lesson" 1921 and "Tennis: Junior, Club, Expert".

Olympics
Spalding Athletic Library sold books on the Olympics.  Book, “The Olympic Games at Athens, 1906” by James Edward Sullivan, copyright 1906, and is focus on Athletics (Track and Field).  The book includes information on the Games site, countries competing, dignitaries responsible for the Games (such as Theodore Roosevelt), pictures of dignitaries and athletes, dates and results of the sporting events, and Olympic Origins. The book also includes a short descriptions of “Throwing the Discus” (pages 156 through 165).  The series also included "The Olympic Games Stockholm 1912" edited by James E Sullivan.

Athletics (track and field)
The 1891 Spalding's Official Athletic Guide and Handbook was published by A. G. Spalding & Bros.  Spalding Athletic Library's 1893 Athletes Guide was published by American Sports Publishing Company.  This guide was available until 1941. 

In 1896 book No. 46 was issued, "Athletic Almanac" by J.E. Sullivan.

November 1904 The American Sports Publishing Co issued Inter-Collegiate Cross Country Association of Amateur Athletes of America: Constitution and Bylaws. The book include results, rules, and campuses in the association. The back of the book includes an abbreviated list of the Spalding Athletic Library books available early 1905.

1909 Spalding issued "Schoolyard Athletics: for youth. The book offers organization, rules, order of events, and illustrations. Editor was James E. Sullivan.

1913 George Orton teamed up with Spalding for "Athletic Training for School Boys." Book includes instructions on training, sprints, distance, hurdles and field events. Book also includes illustrations to assist the athlete.

In 1922 Spalding issued "Official Athletic Almanac"   and "National Collegiate Athletic Association Track and Field Rules & Official Track and Field Guide".   These books included rules, records, meet results, photographs, and past Olympic results.

Spalding issued several "how to" books, one being "How to become a weight thrower" by Olympian James Mitchel.  In 1929 Olympian Archie Hahn "How to Sprint" was issued. 

Spalding published the 1913 IAAF Handbook which included international athletics rules and events eligible for world records.   James E. Sullivan was listed as the Chairman World's Record Committee. The organization is currently known as World Athletics

References

External links
 Society for American Baseball Research (SABR)
 Vintage Basketball
 Spalding's Baseball Books

Amateur Athletic Union
American football books
Association football books
Athletics magazines
Baseball books
Basketball books
Bowling books
Boxing books
Ice hockey books
Monthly magazines published in the United States
Olympic Games books
Rugby football books
Running books
Sports magazines published in the United States
Tennis books
Track and field in the United States
Track and Field books